Old Oval, also called The Oval or University Oval, was a multi-purpose stadium in Syracuse, New York. The field, located open field south of the Hall of Languages, opened in 1895 and was the first on-campus home to the Syracuse Orangemen football team prior to the opening of Archbold Stadium in 1907.

History
The Old Oval at Syracuse University has a rich history dating back to the 1880s, when it was first developed as a baseball diamond and cinder track. The oval-shaped field was roughly laid out in 1887. The field originally was a crop field.

At the time, most team sports were played in the various "Star Parks" around the city of Syracuse, but the university, under president James Roscoe Day, wanted to make the Oval the center of athletics on campus. To achieve this goal, work was started in the 1890s on the sloped baseball ground and track and field commenced in the 1890s with regrading of the field. Finally, on June 8, 1895, the Oval officially opened as the new athletic field. It was financed by John D. Archbold, who refused to let the field be known by his name. In 1895, the grandstand was constructed and the field was formally opened on June 8, 1895, with George H. Bond serving as the master of ceremonies. Archbold later donated $600,000 to build the Archbold Stadium.

This was the Orangemen's first real home field. In the first game played at the stadium on 1895, the 1895 Syracuse Orangemen football team beat Syracuse Athletic Association by a score of 24–0.

Other sports programs also used the field, notably, three-time Olympic gold medallist and Syracuse student Myer Prinstein amazed the crowds at track and field meets.

Later use

However, in 1907, most Syracuse Orange athletic events were moved to the newly built Archbold Stadium, which was considered a more suitable location for such events. No longer an athletic field, the Old Oval was put to variety of uses over the years.

In 1906, architecture professors Frederick William Revels and Earl Hallenbeck, created a plan to convert the Old Oval into a Great Quadrangle. Their work resulted in the construction of Bowne, Carnegie library, Sims, and Machinery halls and Archbold Gymnasium, which were all completed by 1909. It has served as a 200 ft. by 150 ft. rose garden, a skating rink, and was even used for military drills during World War I. It was also the terminus of a toboggan slide from Mount Olympus. By 1914, the Oval had come to be known as the "Old Oval", and in 1929 it was filled in with earth from various excavations to create the central lawn area known simply as the quad.

The quad was the site of the 1970 student strike following the Kent State massacre and the site of Sheets of Expression, in which students spontaneously taped bed sheets to the sidewalks and wrote their observations following the 9/11 attacks.

On November 6, 2010, the Old Oval was dedicated as the Kenneth A. Shaw Quadrangle, honoring the former Syracuse University chancellor. Today, the Shaw quad, as it is more commonly called, is a popular spot on campus for students to relax, study, and socialize. It is now an open green space bounded by Hendricks Chapel, Link Hall, Carnegie Library, Hinds Hall and Huntington Beard Crouse Hall.

References

External links
 Old Oval - Syracuse University Archives

Sports venues in Syracuse, New York
Defunct college football venues
Demolished sports venues in New York (state)
Syracuse Orange football
Syracuse Orange soccer
Multi-purpose stadiums in the United States
Syracuse Orange sports venues
1890 establishments in New York (state)
Sports venues completed in 1907
1906 disestablishments in New York (state)
American football venues in New York (state)
College soccer venues in the United States
College track and field venues in the United States
Athletics (track and field) venues in New York (state)
Defunct athletics (track and field) venues in the United States